Schmitz Park Creek is a stream in the West Seattle neighborhood of Seattle, Washington, United States. It is located entirely within Schmitz Park.

Landforms of Seattle
Rivers of Washington (state)
Rivers of King County, Washington
West Seattle, Seattle